Rhizopogon subcaerulescens is an ectomycorrhizal fungus used as a soil inoculant in agriculture and horticulture. The species was described by American mycologist Alexander H. Smith in a 1966 publication.

References

Rhizopogonaceae
Fungi described in 1966
Fungi of North America